() is a joint-stock investment company based in Rome, Italy.  It owns a minority of Grandi Stazioni SpA, the company that manages and rehabilitates 13 major Italian railway stations.

The majority shareholder of Grandi Stazioni, at 60%, is Ferrovie dello Stato.

Shareholders
The shareholders of Eurostazioni are:

 32,71% Sintonia (Benetton Group)
 32,71% Vianini Lavori (Gruppo Caltagirone)
 32,71% Pirelli & C.
 1,87% SNCF Participations S.A. (Société nationale des chemins de fer français)

See also

Centostazioni
High-speed rail
Rete Ferroviaria Italiana
Trenitalia

References

This article is based upon a translation of the Italian language version as at September 2011.

Companies based in Rome
Investment companies of Italy